Callictita is a genus of butterflies in the family Lycaenidae. The species of this genus are endemic to New Guinea (Australasian realm).

Species
The cyara species group
Callictita cyara Bethune-Baker, 1908
The albiplaga species group
Callictita albiplaga (Joicey & Talbot, 1916) New Guinea
Callictita lara Parsons, 1986 New Guinea
The mala species group
Callictita felgara Parsons, 1986 New Guinea
Callictita jola Parsons, 1986 New Guinea
Callictita mala Parsons, 1986 New Guinea
The afrakiana species group
Callictita arfakiana Wind & Clench, 1947 New Guinea
Callictita tifala Parsons, 1986 New Guinea
Unknown species group
Callictita upola Parsons & Hirowatari, 1988 New Guinea

External links

"Callictita Bethune-Baker, 1908" at Markku Savela's Lepidoptera and Some Other Life Forms

Polyommatini
Lycaenidae genera
Endemic fauna of New Guinea